= Dubree, West Virginia =

Unincorporated community in West Virginia, United States

Dubre, West Virginia
- Unincorporated community
- Location within West Virginia Location within the United States
- Coordinates: 38°3′9″N 80°59′15″W
- Country: United States
- State: West Virginia
- County: Fayette
- Elevation: 2,005 ft (611 m)
- Time zone: UTC-5 (Eastern (EST))
  - Summer (DST): UTC-4 (EDT)
- GNIS ID: 1556222

Dubree was an unincorporated community in Fayette County, West Virginia, United States.
